Sotir Ferrara (5 December 1937 – 25 November 2017) was the Bishop of the Eparchy of Piana degli Albanesi, a diocese of the Italo-Albanian Catholic Church in Sicily, Italy.

Biography

Born in Piana degli Albanesi on 5 December 1937, after studying in preparation for the priesthood on 19 November 1960, he was ordained priest.

On 15 October 1988 he was elected by the Pope John Paul II to the bishopric of Eparchy of Piana degli Albanesi.  He received episcopal consecration on 15 January 1989 by Archbishop Miroslav Stefan Marusyn. He retired in April 2013 upon reaching the age limit of 75.

Bishop Ferrara died on 25 November 2017, at the age of 80.

Apostolic Succession
OSBM Archbishop Andreas Alexander Szeptycki (Sheptytsky), OSBM 
Archbishop Ivan Bucko
Archbishop Miroslav Stefan Marusyn
Bishop Sotir Ferrara

References

External links 
 Eparchy's Bishop page

1937 births
2017 deaths
Italian people of Arbëreshë descent
Bishops of Piana degli Albanesi
Pontifical Greek College of Saint Athanasius alumni